The 2010–11 All-Ireland Junior Club Football Championship was the tenth staging of the All-Ireland Junior Club Football Championship since its establishment by the Gaelic Athletic Association.

The All-Ireland final was played on 12 February 2011 at Croke Park in Dublin, between St Mary's and Swanlinbar. St Mary's won the match by 3-13 to 1-05 to claim their first ever championship title.

All-Ireland Junior Club Football Championship

All-Ireland final

References

2010 in Irish sport
2011 in Irish sport
All-Ireland Junior Club Football Championship
All-Ireland Junior Club Football Championship